Christianne Gout is a Mexican dancer and actress, who began her career as an actress in a Venezuelan TV series La Inolvidable and was especially known as a heroine of the film Salsa by Joyce Sherman Buñuel.

Filmography
 Salsa a French Spanish film (2000) .... Nathalie
... aka ¡Salsa! (Spain)

 Acapulco H.E.A.T. an American Canadian TV series.... T.C. Doyle (1 episode, 1999)
- Code Name: Cumshaw (1999) TV episode .... T.C. Doyle

 Undercurrent (1999) .... Illiana Vasquez
 Fibra óptica (1998) (as Christiane Gout) .... Rebeca
... aka Optic Fiber (USA: video title)

 Nada personal (TV series) (1997) Mexican TV series of 400 episodes .... Camila de los Reyes
 La Inolvidable (1996) TV series ... María Teresa Montero

External links
 

Mexican actresses
Mexican female dancers
Living people
Year of birth missing (living people)